Anja Krause (born ) was a German female volleyball player. She was part of the Germany women's national volleyball team.

She participated in the 2001 FIVB Volleyball World Grand Prix.

References

External links
http://www.cev.lu/competition-area/PlayerDetails.aspx?TeamID=5668&PlayerID=16565&ID=366
https://www.welt.de/print-welt/article372004/Personalsorgen-im-Volleyball-Zuspielerin-verzweifelt-gesucht.html
http://www.smash-hamburg.de/nat-teams/hnt-f/hnt-f-gesamt.htm
http://www.volleyball-verband.de/de/redaktion/news-archiv/2006/international--krause-und-lammers-verlieren-pokalfinale-in-den-niederlanden-/

1977 births
Living people
German women's volleyball players
Place of birth missing (living people)
Volleyball players from Berlin